Frank Fay (born Francis Anthony Donner; November 17, 1891 – September 25, 1961) was an American vaudeville comedian (the first stand-up) and film and stage actor. He is considered an important pioneer in stand-up comedy. For a time he was a well known and influential star, but he later fell into obscurity, in part because of his abrasive personality and fascist political views. He played the role of Elwood P. Dowd in the 1944 Broadway play Harvey by the American playwright Mary Coyle Chase. He is best known as actress Barbara Stanwyck's first husband. Their troubled marriage is thought by some to be the basis of the 1937 film A Star Is Born, in which the previously unknown wife shoots to stardom while her husband's career goes into sharp decline. Fay was notorious for his bigotry and alcoholism, and according to the American Vaudeville Museum, "even when sober, he was dismissive and unpleasant, and he was disliked by most of his contemporaries".

Although very talented, Fay offended most of the people he worked with because of his enormous ego. Former vaudevillian and radio star Fred Allen remarked, "The last time I saw him he was walking down Lover's Lane, holding his own hand." Actor Robert Wagner wrote that Fay was "one of the most dreadful men in the history of show business. Fay was a drunk, an anti-Semite, and a wife-beater, and Barbara [Stanwyck] had had to endure all of that", while according to actor and comedian Milton Berle "Fay's friends could be counted on the missing arm of a one-armed man." Berle, who was Jewish, claimed to have once hit Fay in the face with a stage brace after Fay, on seeing Berle watching his act from offstage, called out, "Get that little Jew bastard out of the wings".

Early life
Born as Francis Anthony Donner in San Francisco, California, to Irish Catholic parents, he took the professional name of Frank Fay after concluding that his birth name was not suitable for the stage.

As a child, he appeared in Victor Herbert's operetta Babes in Toyland.

Vaudeville
He enjoyed considerable success as a variety artist starting around 1918, telling jokes and stories in a carefully planned "off the cuff" manner that was very original for the time. He was one of the most analyzed comedians, with his timing and delivery praised. Jack Benny stated that he modeled his early stage character on Fay.

He formed several partnerships, including with Lieutenant Gitz Rice and appearing as Dyer & Fay and Fay Fay & Co.

During the 1920s, Fay was vaudeville's highest-paid headliner, earning $17,500 a week. He often played the Palace Theatre in New York City, sometimes once a month.

Later, he was successful as a revue and nightclub comedian and master of ceremonies, arguably originating the form, and also appeared frequently on radio shows. He was cast in a bit part as master of ceremonies in the night club sequence of Nothing Sacred (1937).

One of his most enduring routines, which he performed as late as the 1950s, was taking a popular song and analysing the "senseless" lyrics. It did not endear him to songwriters. For example, "Tea for Two":

"Picture you, upon my knee."  (This guy just owns one chair?)
"Just tea for two and two for tea, me for you, and you for me, alone"
So, here's the situation: the guy just has one chair, but enough tea for two, so he has two for tea. If anyone else shows up, he shoots 'em!
"Nobody near us, to see us or hear us." Who'd want to listen to a couple of people drinking tea?

"We won't have it known, dear, that we own a telephone."
So, this guy's too cheap to get another chair, he has a telephone, but won't tell anyone about it!

"Dawn will break, and you'll awake, and start to bake a sugar cake."
Oh, this poor woman's life, I can see it now. Dawn breaks, and she's got to start baking, can't even run a brush through her hair, down in the dark, feeling around for the flour...

"For me to take for all the guys to see."
I can see that! "Hey, guys, I've got something the wife gave me!"
Is it a new tie?  Is it a set of tires?
Nahhh - it's a sugar cake! Three layers, with a coconut cream filling!
"Oh, that's just ducky!," they all say, and they crown him with it.

Film
When talkies arrived, Warner Bros. studio was eager to put him under contract along with a host of other famous stage personalities. Fay was cast as master of ceremonies in Warner Bros.' most expensive production of 1929, the all-star, all-talking revue The Show of Shows (1929). Based on the success of that film, Fay was quickly signed up for an all-Technicolor musical comedy entitled Under a Texas Moon (1930), in which he also displayed his singing abilities. The movie was a box-office success and made a hit of the theme song, also titled "Under a Texas Moon". Fay sang the theme song several times throughout the picture. Another expensive picture, Bright Lights (1930), an extravagant all-Technicolor musical, quickly followed. Fay also starred in The Matrimonial Bed (1930), a Pre-Code comedy in which he sang the song "Fleur d'Amour" twice. Fay quickly found himself associated with musical films, and this led to a decline in his popularity when public interest in musical films waned in 1931. In fact, in his next film, God's Gift to Women (1931), the musical sequences were cut for the American release, but were retained for other countries.

Fay was always cast as a debonair lover, irresistible to women, and he frequently threw in suggestive jokes (e.g., on homosexuality and sex). His pre-Code risque humor did not bode well with the rising conservative movement ushered in by the Great Depression. Fay's performance in God's Gift to Women failed to get the rave reviews he had previously enjoyed. He attempted to produce his own picture in 1932 and struck a deal with Warner Bros. to have them release his film A Fool's Advice. It failed, and resurfaced five years later as Meet the Mayor, with new titles prepared by the Warner Bros. studio. These new credits reflect the low regard Fay's professional colleagues had for him: his name appears in the smallest possible type as both star and author, with the supporting cast members' names more than twice the size of Fay's. Fay made only one more appearance for Warner, billed near the bottom of the cast in Stars over Broadway (1935), in which he presided over a radio amateur hour.

Later career
Fay made a brief screen comeback in 1943 for the low-budget Monogram Pictures. He was teamed with comedian Billy Gilbert for a series of wartime comedies, but walked out after the opener, Spotlight Scandals. Fay was replaced by another comedian more congenial to Gilbert, Shemp Howard.

In 1944, Antoinette Perry cast Fay to star in Harvey, about an alcoholic and his friend Harvey, an invisible rabbit, which was his last success.

In 1945, Equity president Bert Lytell censured Fay for demanding that Actors' Equity investigate each member who supported the Spanish Refugee Appeal, or who criticized the Spanish Catholic Church for executing leftists, for un-American activity. The House Committee on Un-American Activities investigated those members.

In January 1946, just months after Nazi Germany had been defeated, a rally of 10,000 white supremacists gathered at Madison Square Garden for a pro-Fascist event called "The Friends of Frank Fay", organized by Franco supporters, members of the Ku Klux Klan, and the American Nazi Party.

In 1951, he had third billing in a movie titled Love Nest.

Personal life
Fay married Barbara Stanwyck in 1928, when she was relatively unknown. He helped her further her career in films, and she was given a contract by Warner Bros. late in 1930. Their only film appearance together was a brief skit in the short film The Stolen Jools (1931). They adopted a son, Dion, on December 5, 1932. The marriage reportedly soured when Fay's career was eclipsed by Stanwyck's success, and they divorced in 1935.

Later life and death
Shortly before his death, Fay was declared legally incompetent. On September 20, 1961, he was admitted to St. John's Hospital in Santa Monica, California. He died there five days later, aged 69, of a ruptured abdominal aorta. Fay was buried in Calvary Cemetery in Los Angeles.

Honors
Fay has two stars on the Hollywood Walk of Fame.

Filmography

References

External links

Frank Fay at Virtual History
 The Fascist Stand Up Comic
 The First Stand-Up Comic

1891 births
1961 deaths
20th-century American male actors
American male film actors
American male stage actors
American people of Irish descent
Burials at Calvary Cemetery (Los Angeles)
Donaldson Award winners
Male actors from San Francisco
Male actors from the San Francisco Bay Area
People from Greater Los Angeles
Vaudeville performers
Warner Bros. contract players
American fascists
American stand-up comedians